Joseph Roger N'Yoka M'Vula (born 7 September 1953), known professionally as Jossart N’Yoka Longo, is a Congolese singer-songwriter and musician. In December of 1969, alongside Félix Manuaku Waku and Papa Wemba, he co-founded Zaïko Langa Langa, one of the most influential African bands, which he also leads.

Early life and career

Early life, 1953 – 1968 
N'Yoka Longo was born in Kinshasa on September 7, 1953, to a family of two kids, his late older sister and him. His father was a worker in a company and his mother sold bananas.

Career, 1968 – now 
He began his career in a big band known as Bel Guide National where he performed with Felix Manuaku and Teddy Sukami was the band secretary.

On December 24, 1969, in Kinshasa, he co-founded Zaiko Langa Langa together with Papa Wemba and a group of fellow Bel Guide National members, including Henri Mongombe, D. V. Moanda, Marcelin Bita, and Félix Manuaku Waku. Jossart Nyoka will penned the band big hit "La Tout Neige", on the B-side of Papa Wemba's song, "Pauline" and will go on writing many others songs including "Ngadiadia" and many other, however that first part of his life in Zaiko will not be very successful and he will be at a later stage overshadowed by the Isifi which was the name of the popular group of singers then. Despite the longevity of Zaiko Langa Langa and their uncountable personnel changes, N'Yoka Longo never left and for a very longtime during the classic era of Zaiko he and Bimi Ombale incarnated the image and style of Zaiko, and he is currently the leader and main songwriter of the band.

Being Zaire's biggest band, 1975 – 1988 
In 1975, he traveled to Ghana and Togo with his band, and while they were touring, the album "Zaïre-Ghana" was recorded.

In 1977, Longo was chosen to perform with Zaire's National Orchestra at FESTAC in Lagos; this was a significant thrust to his popularity, that has been steadily growing since then. He has written major Zaiko Langa Langa hits, including "La Tout Neige", "Amando", "Ngadiadia", "Nalali Pongi", "Lidjo", "Ma", "Sentiment Awa" which was crowned 1979 song of the year, "Cherie Nzembo", "Pa Oki", "Mimi C'Est Trop Tard", "Crois Moi", "Amour Suicide", "SOS Maya", "SVP Mbey", "Paiement Cash" and played in over 100 international concert tours.

N'yoka Longo has been reproached of leading Zaiko in a totalitarian, rigorous manners that has been the reason of many departures of prominent members from the group and many major splits of Zaiko and mostly for failing to reach out to his friend and longtime colleague "Bimi Ombale" during the 1988 splits.

Gold decade and actual days, 1990 – now 
A distinctive feature of N'Yoka Longo is that, as a polyglot, he sings in several languages, including Kikongo, Swahili, French.

Between 1990 and 2000, he released influential Soukous albums like Jamais Sans Nous, Avis de Recherche, Sans Issue and Poison.

In 2002, while touring with Zaiko in Europe, N'Yoka Longo was arrested and jailed by the Belgium justice. He was charged of facilitating clandestine and illegal immigration. Couple months later, he was released under bond paid by the D.R. Congo Government. He stayed and performed in Europe with his band Zaiko until 2009. He then returned in January that year to his country, D. R. Congo, where Zaiko has its headquarters.

Apart from Franco Luambo Makiadi and the latter's TPOK Jazz Band, N'yoka Longo and Zaiko Langa Langa proved influential in spreading Congolese Rumba music across the rest of Africa, especially within focal points in East and Central Africa like Kisii, Kisumu, Nairobi, Dar es Salaam, Mwanza, Lilongwe, Lusaka, Kampala, Kigali, and Bujumbura.

N'Yoka Longo and Zaiko's stage performances are credited with fueling subsequent contemporary stage performances by other Congolese musicians like Koffi Olomide, Ferre Gola, and Fally Ipupa.

His latest album, is named "Sève", and was released the day of his birthday on 2019.

Footnotes

References
 Nyoka Longo: The Charismatic Leader of Zaiko Langa Langa

20th-century Democratic Republic of the Congo male singers
Living people
1953 births
21st-century Democratic Republic of the Congo male singers